Louis "Louey" Whitman (February 3, 1900 – January 27, 1979) was an American football coach. He served as the head football coach at Lafayette High School from 1928 to 1941 and at the Southwestern Louisiana Institute of Liberal and Technical Learning (now known as the University of Louisiana at Lafayette) from 1942 to 1945 compiling career college football coaching record of 14–14–2.

A native of Logan County, Arkansas, Whitman was a letterman while playing for the Wyoming football team during their 1925, 1926, and 1927 seasons. He next served as head coach of Lafayette High School from 1928 to 1941. Whitman was hired as head coach of Southwestern Louisiana prior to their 1942 season after head coach Johnny Cain and lead assistant Gee Mitchell took leaves of absence to serve in the military during World War II.

Head coaching record

College

References

External links
 

1900 births
1979 deaths
Louisiana Ragin' Cajuns football coaches
Wyoming Cowboys football players
People from Logan County, Arkansas
High school football coaches in Louisiana